Iris is an ambiguous color term, usually referring to shades ranging from blue-violet to violet.   

However, in certain applications, it has been applied to an even wider array of colors, including pale blue, mauve, pink, and even yellow (the color of the inner part of the iris flower).

The name is derived from the iris flower, which comes in a broad spectrum of colors.

The first recorded use of iris as a color name in English was in the year 1916.

See also
 Iris (disambiguation)
 List of colors

References

Shades of blue